Sutera is a genus of annual and perennial flowering plants and shrubs of the family Scrophulariaceae mainly confined to Africa.

Taxonomy
Sutera cordata was named Manulea cordata in 1800 by Thunberg. Bentham renamed it Chaenostoma in 1836, Kuntze changed it to Sutera in 1891 on the grounds of synonymy. In 1994 Hilliard considered the two names subgenera of Sutera, but in 2005 Kornhall and Bremer separated the two again, placing S. cordata in Chaenostoma.

Species
, Plants of the World Online accepted the following species:
Sutera brunnea Hiern
Sutera burkeana (Benth.) Hiern
Sutera cooperi Hiern
Sutera foetida (Andrews) Roth
Sutera griquensis Hiern

Formerly placed in this genus
Sutera cordata → Chaenostoma cordatum

References

External links
 Pretoria National Botanical Garden: Chaenostoma cordata
 Kristo Pienaar: South African 'What Flower Is That'? Struik, 2003.  
 Aluka: Sutera

Scrophulariaceae
Scrophulariaceae genera